The 1993 Supercopa de España was a two-leg Spanish football fixture played on 2 December and 16 December 1993. It was contested by Real Madrid, who were Spanish Cup winners in 1992–93, and FC Barcelona, who won the 1992–93 Spanish League. Real Madrid won 4–2 on aggregate.

Match details

First leg

Second leg

See also
El Clásico

References
 List of Super Cup Finals 1993 RSSSF.com

Supercopa de Espana Final
Supercopa de España
Supercopa de Espana 1993
Supercopa de Espana 1993
December 1993 sports events in Europe
1993 in Spanish sport
Supercopa de España